Ethiopsella is a monotypic snout moth genus. Its only species, Ethiopsella nasuta, is found in Nigeria. Both the genus and species were described by George Hampson in 1930.

References

Phycitinae
Monotypic moth genera
Moths of Africa